This is a list of heads of government under Austrian emperors.

State chancellors of the Archduchy of Austria (1527–1804)
From 1664/69 the Privy Conference (Geheime Konferenz), a committee of the Imperial Privy Council (Geheimer Rat), provided advice to Emperor Leopold I whereby the Austrian court chancellor, responsible for the Habsburg 'Hereditary Lands', served as rapporteur and thereby gained increasing influence. The Habsburg diplomatic service was re-organised, when Emperor Charles VI by resolution of 1720 declared Court Chancellor Philipp Ludwig Wenzel von Sinzendorf responsible for foreign policy issues. Upon Sinzendorf's death in February 1742, Archduchess Maria Theresa finally separated the central Habsburg State Chancellery responsible of Foreign Affairs from the domestic Austrian Court Chancellery.

1527 Leonhard Freiherr von Harrach
1528–1539 Bernhard von Cles
1539–1544 Dr. Georg Gienger
1544–1558 Dr. Jakob Jonas
1558–1563 Dr. Georg Sigmund Seid
1563–1577 Dr. Johann Baptist Weber
1577–1587 Dr. Sigmund Viehäuser
1587–1594 Dr. Jacob Kurz von Senftenau
1594–1597 Johann Wolf Freymann von Oberhausen
1597–1606 Dr. Rudolf Coradutz
1606–1612 Leopold Freiherr von Stralendorf
1612–1620 Hans Ludwig von Ulm
1620–1637 Johann Baptist Verda von Verdenberg
1637–1656 Johann Mathias Prücklmayer
1656–1665 Hans Joachim Sinzendorf
1667–1683 Johann Paul Hocher von Hohengran
1683–1693 Theodor von Strattman
1694–1705 Julius Friedrich Bucellini
1705–1715 Johann Friedrich von Seilern

Francis I (1804–1835)

Ferdinand I (1835–1848)

Franz Joseph I (1848–1916)

This is a list of heads of government under Emperor Franz Joseph I of Austria. Franz Joseph was born on 18 August 1830 and died on 21 November 1916, his imperial reign lasted from 2 December 1848 to 21 November 1916. His predecessor was Ferdinand I & V and his successor was Charles I & IV.

Franz Joseph ruled over the Austrian Empire which had a minister-president and later a chairman of the Ministers' Conference as head of government. After the Austro-Hungarian Compromise of 1867 the joint monarchy of Austria-Hungary had their own heads of government: the minister-president of Cisleithania for Cisleithania (the Austrian part of the empire) and the prime minister of the Kingdom of Hungary for Transleithania (the Hungarian part of the empire).

One minister-president of the Austrian Empire, six chairmen of the Ministers' Conference of the Austrian Empire, twenty-two ministers-president of Cisleithania and fourteen prime ministers of the Kingdom of Hungary have served under the reign of Emperor Franz Joseph I.

Austrian Empire

Chairmen of the Ministers' Council for Common Affairs

Cisleithania

Transleithania

Charles I & IV (1916–1918)

This is a list of heads of government under Emperor Charles I of Austria. Charles was born on 17 August 1887 and died on 1 April 1922, his imperial reign lasted from 21 November 1916 to 11 November 1918. His predecessor was Franz Joseph I. Since the Austro-Hungarian Empire dissolved and the monarchy abolished on 11 November 1918 Charles was the last Austrian emperor and thus not succeeded.

Five ministers-president of Cisleithania and five prime Ministers of the Kingdom of Hungary have served under the reign of Emperor Charles I.

Chairmen of the Ministers' Council for Common Affairs

Cisleithania

Transleithania

See also 
 Austria-Hungary
 Imperial Council
 Diet of Hungary

Emperors of Austria
Ministers-President of Austria
Lists of political office-holders in Austria
Austria politics-related lists
Austrian Emperors

Prime Ministers